Salebriaria turpidella is a species of snout moth. It is found in North America, where it has been recorded from Alabama, Florida, Georgia, Illinois, Indiana, Maine, Mississippi, Oklahoma, South Carolina, Tennessee and West Virginia.

References

Moths described in 1888
Phycitinae
Moths of North America